The Isdera Commendatore GT is a 2+2-seater sports car produced by the German car manufacturer Isdera. It was introduced at the Auto China in 2018. It is intended to address above all the Chinese sports car market. So far only two pieces have been built. It also has gull-wing doors.

References 

Cars introduced in 2018
Commendatore GT
Electric sports cars
Rear-wheel-drive vehicles